Heini-Klopfer-Skiflugschanze (Heini Klopfer Ski Flying Hill) is a ski flying hill in Oberstdorf, Germany. It was opened in 1950, and was later renamed after its architect, Heini Klopfer. A total of 21 world records have been set on the hill.

History

1949: Plans and realisation 
In 1949, they were originally discussing about whether they should just rather enlarge the existing Schattenbergschanze or build a complete new hill with calculation point at K120. 

Three ski jumpers Heini Klopfer, Sepp Weiler and Toni Brutscher together made a final decision to build a complete new hill and they found the perfect location. Inspired by Planica, the wanted to beat legendary Bloudkova velikanka in Slovenia, as the long time world record breaking and leading hill. Starting in July, hill construction was completed as planned in only five months, finished on 10 December.

1950: Opening with four world records 
On 2 February 1950, hill test was reserved for founding trio only. Heini Klopfer jumped as first ever landing at 90 metres, Toni Brutscher at 112 metres and Sepp Weiler at 115 metres.

From 28 February to 5 March 1950, hill was officially opened with ski flying week, which was a just a copy of the competition format from Planica. Between 60,000 and 170,000 people has gathered in total.

On 28 February, Austrian ski jumper Willi Gantschnigg set the first official world record at 124 metres (408 feet) and two days later broke his leg crashing at 130 metres (427 ft) world record distance. 

On 2 March, Sepp Weiler improved world record at 127 metres (417 feet). And Austrian Hans Eder was disqualiefied at 130 metres (427 ft) world record distance.

On 3 March, records were beat again by Andreas Däscher at 130 metres (427 feet) and Dan Netzell at 135 metres (443 feet). After both of them Sepp Weiler landed at 133 metres (436 feet).

1951: Ski Flying Week II with world record 
From 28 February to 4 March 1951, second Ski Flying Week visited total over 120,000 people. Finish Tauno Luiro set the official world record at 139 metres (456 feet) on the third day of competition.

1952: Ski Flying Week III 

From 28 February to 2 March 1952, third Ski Flying Week with over 60,000 people. Competition was interrupted all three days due to weather. FIS committee decided to grade only distances. There was no official results published.

All jumpers that exceeded 100 metres distances, received a commemorative needle engraved with the distance achieved. Toivo Lauren from set the longest distance of the weekend at 131 metres (430 ft).

1955: Ski Flying Week IV 
From 26 to 27 February 1955, fourth Ski Flying Week was held. Four jumps in total, two from each day, counted into official results. Hemmo Silvennoinen won the competition with 452.5 points in front of Alfredsen and Brutscher.

1958: Bolkart fell at WR distance 
On 21 March 1958, first day of Ski Flying Week V was held in front of 5,000 people. Trial jumps (reserved competition day) opened by Toni Brutscher at 97 metres were held, which would conditionally count into official results, if one of two competition days would be canceled due to weather conditions. 36 ski jumpers from ten different countries were on start, jumps were scored and judged by Straumann method. Aarne Valkama made a top score with 239.8 points (136 and 126 metres).

On 22 March 1958, first competition day was held in front of 18,000 people. Only one of 35 jumpers didn't beat 100 metres mark. Andreas Däscher made a top score today with 237.8 points (125 and 128 metres).

On 23 March 1958, last competition day was held in front of 50,000 people. West German Max Bolkart fell at 139 metres (456 feet) world record distance. Helmut Recknagel (378.8 points) won in front of Däscher (369.6 points) and Vitikainen (351.6 points).

1961: Šlibar set new world record at 141 metres 
On 23 February 1961, first day of Ski Flying Week VI was held in front of 8,000 people, with first trial jumps in three rounds. Among 36 jumpers, Otto Leodolter, Maatela and Wolfgang Happle set the distance of the day at 136 metres (446 ft).

On 24 February 1961, second day of Ski Flying Week VI was held in front of 20,000 people, second trial jumps in two rounds (reserved day), which would conditionally count into official results, if one of next two competition days would be canceled due to weather conditions. In the second round at 13:41 local time, Yugoslavian (Slovenian) Jože Šlibar set the new WR at 141 metres (463 feet), with 103 km/h at take-off. Heini Klopfer himself was measuring the distance for half an hour, then published it.

On 25 February 1961, first competition day with two rounds counting into final results, first round was canceled. Wolfgang Happle from West Germany fell at 145 metres (476 feet) world record distance.

On 26 February 1961, second and final competition day in front of 50,000 people was held. Three rounds, two best (and total four) rounds counted into final results. Helmut Recknagel from East Germany won the two day competition.

1964: Sjöberg, Motejlek and Zandanel set world records 
On 14 February 1964, first day of Ski Flying Week VII was held in front of 3,000 people, an official training (reserved competition day) in two round, which would conditionally count into official results, if one of next two competition days would be canceled due to weather conditions. 36 jumpers from 12 countries performed today. Kjell Sjöberg from Sweden tied Šlibar's world record at 141 metres (463 feet). Points sistem scoring was classic, as Straumann's device didn't work properly.

On 15 February 1964, first competition day in front of 20,000 people was held, with three rounds, two best into final results. Dalibor Motejlek from Czechoslovakia set the new world record at 142 metres (466 feet).

On 16 February 1964, second and final competition day was held. Three rounds today, two best (and total four) rounds counted into final results. Nilo Zandanel from Italy set the new world record at 144 metres (472 feet).

Events

Hill record 
List of all hill and world records set on this hill (both official and invalid record distances with fall or touch).

Note

References

External links 
Heini-Klopfer-Skiflugschanze official 
Oberstdorf.de 
Heini-Klopfer-Skiflugschanze skisprungschanzen.com

Ski areas and resorts in Germany
Ski jumping venues in Germany
Ski flying venues
Oberallgäu
Sports venues in Bavaria
Sport in Oberstdorf
1950 establishments in West Germany
Sports venues completed in 1950